The Unimog 435 is a vehicle of the Unimog-series by Mercedes-Benz. 30,726 vehicles were produced from 1975 to 1993 in eight different variants in the Mercedes-Benz Unimog-plant in Gaggenau. The vehicles were sold as Unimog U 1300 L and Unimog U 1700 L. Best selling vehicle was the U 1300 L, which was built as a special vehicle for the Bundeswehr and the German fire department often. The successor Unimog 437 with a similar appearance is still in production. The Unimog 436 is based on the Unimog 435. It is made for export and has a different cab. The names of Unimog-vehicles may create confusion, the U 1300 belongs to the Unimog 425-series, while the U 1300 L belongs to the Unimog 435-series.

Description 

The Unimog 435 belongs to the heavy duty Unimog series which started with the Unimog 425. Compared with the Unimog 425, the 435 has a longer wheelbase and more powerful engines. Just as the 425, it has the "edgy" cab (425.820), and is designed as a 7,5-ton truck. Like other Unimogs it has a ladder frame, portal axles and coil springs. It is a rear wheel drive vehicle with selectable four wheel drive (part time four-wheel drive). The gearbox is a fully synchronized 8-speed manual gearbox with lockable differentials. A reduction gear and a crawler gear were available as additional accessory. The brake system uses compressed air to activate the dual hydraulic circuit disc brakes. A compressed air trailer brake system was an additional accessory. An engine brake was available as well. The Unimog 435 uses hydraulic power steering. The engines in the Unimog 435 are naturally aspirated or turbocharged Mercedes-Benz OM 353 series engines. Starting in 1987 Mercedes-Benz used the OM 366 engine instead.

Types' designations 

The Unimog 435 was made in eight different types, with the 435.115 type being by far the most common Unimog 435, with 21,775 units built. In total, 473 units of the 435.115 type were built as RW1 fire engines (as depicted in the infobox).

Technical Specifications

References 

Mercedes-Benz trucks
Mercedes-Benz vehicles
Military trucks